This is a list of the Australian species of the family Cossidae. It also acts as an index to the species articles and forms part of the full List of moths of Australia.

Cossinae
Cossodes lyonetii White, 1841
Culama alpina Kallies & D.J. Hilton, 2012
Culama anthracica Kallies & D.J. Hilton, 2012
Culama australis Walker, 1856
Culama crepera Turner, 1939
Culama dasythrix Turner, 1945
Culama glauca Kallies & D.J. Hilton, 2012
Culama suffusca Kallies & D.J. Hilton, 2012
Macrocyttara expressa (T.P. Lucas, 1902)
Macrocyttara pamphaea Turner, 1945
Zyganisus acalanthis Kallies & D.J. Hilton, 2012
Zyganisus caliginosus (Walker, 1856)
Zyganisus cadigalorum Kallies & D.J. Hilton, 2012
Zyganisus fulvicollis (Gaede, 1933)
Zyganisus propedia Kallies & D.J. Hilton, 2012

Zeuzerinae
Brephomorpha cineraria (Turner, 1945)
Catoxophylla cyanauges Turner, 1945
Duomitus ceramica (Walker, 1865)
Endoxyla acontucha (Turner, 1903)
Endoxyla affinis (Rothschild, 1896)
Endoxyla amphiplecta (Turner, 1932)
Endoxyla angasii R. Felder, 1874
Endoxyla biarpiti (Tindale, 1953)
Endoxyla bipustulatus (Walker, 1865)
Endoxyla cinereus (Tepper, 1890)
Endoxyla columbina T.P. Lucas, 1898
Endoxyla coscinopa (Lower, 1901)
Endoxyla coscinophanes (Turner, 1945)
Endoxyla coscinota (Turner, 1903)
Endoxyla decoratus (Swinhoe, 1892)
Endoxyla dictyoschema (Turner, 1915)
Endoxyla didymoplaca (Turner, 1945)
Endoxyla duponchelii (Newman, 1856)
Endoxyla edwardsorum (Tepper, 1891)
Endoxyla eluta (Rothschild, 1903)
Endoxyla encalypti Herrich-Schäffer, 1854
Endoxyla episticha (Turner, 1945)
Endoxyla eremonoma (Turner, 1906)
Endoxyla eumitra (Turner, 1926)
Endoxyla euplecta (Turner, 1945)
Endoxyla euryphaea (Turner, 1945)
Endoxyla grisea (Gaede, 1933)
Endoxyla houlberti (Oberthür, 1916)
Endoxyla interlucens T.P. Lucas, 1898
Endoxyla leucomochla (Turner, 1915)
Endoxyla lichenea (Rothschild, 1896)
Endoxyla lituratus (Donovan, 1805)
Endoxyla mackeri (Oberthür, 1916)
Endoxyla macleayi Froggatt, 1894
Endoxyla magnifica (Rothschild, 1896)
Endoxyla magniguttata (Gaede, 1933)
Endoxyla methychroa (Turner, 1911)
Endoxyla minutiscripta T.P. Lucas, 1898
Endoxyla nephocosma (Turner, 1902)
Endoxyla neuroxantha (Lower, 1900)
Endoxyla nubila (Turner, 1945)
Endoxyla opposita (Walker, 1865)
Endoxyla perigypsa (Lower, 1915)
Endoxyla phaeocosma (Turner, 1911)
Endoxyla polyplecta (Turner, 1932)
Endoxyla polyploca (Turner, 1911)
Endoxyla pulchra (Rothschild, 1896)
Endoxyla punctifimbria (Walker, 1865)
Endoxyla reticulosa (Turner, 1945)
Endoxyla secta T.P. Lucas, 1898
Endoxyla sordida (Rothschild, 1896)
Endoxyla stenoptila (Turner, 1911)
Endoxyla tanyctena (Turner, 1945)
Endoxyla tenebrifer (Walker, 1865)
Endoxyla tigrinus (Herrich-Schäffer, 1853)
Endoxyla turneri (Roepke, 1955)
Endoxyla vittata (Walker, 1856)
Endoxyla zophoplecta (Turner, 1902)
Endoxyla zophospila (Turner, 1945)
Skeletophyllon tempestua (T.P. Lucas, 1898)
Sympycnodes adrienneae Kallies & D.J. Hilton, 2012
Sympycnodes arachnophora (Turner, 1945)
Sympycnodes digitata Kallies & D.J. Hilton, 2012
Sympycnodes dunnorum Kallies & D.J. Hilton, 2012
Sympycnodes epicycla (Turner, 1945)
Sympycnodes interstincta Kallies & D.J. Hilton, 2012
Sympycnodes rhaptodes Turner, 1942
Sympycnodes salterra Kallies & D.J. Hilton, 2012
Sympycnodes tripartita (T.P. Lucas, 1892)
Sympycnodes uptoni Kallies & D.J. Hilton, 2012
Trismelasmos ardzhuna Yakovlev, 2011
Trismelasmos donovani (Rothschild, 1897)
Trismelasmos tectorius (Swinhoe, 1901)
Xyleutes hyphinoe (Cramer, 1777)
Xyleutes persona (Le Guillou, 1841)
Orientozeuzera aeglospila (Turner, 1915)
Orientozeuzera quieta (Turner, 1932)

The following species belongs to the subfamily Zeuzerinae, but has not been assigned to a genus yet. Given here is the original name given to the species when it was first described:
Eudoxyla cineraria Illidge, 1898

Unplaced to Subfamily
Archaeoses magicosema (Meyrick, 1936)
Archaeoses pentasema (Lower, 1915)
Archaeoses polygrapha (Lower, 1893)
Brevicyttara cyclospila (Turner, 1945)
Charmoses dumigani Turner, 1932
Eusthenica treicleiota (Bethune-Baker, 1911)
Idioses littleri Turner, 1927
Ptilomacra senex Walker, 1855

References
, 2012: Revision of Cossinae and small Zeuzerinae from Australia (Lepidoptera: Cossidae). Zootaxa 3454: 1-62. Abstract: .
, 2011: Catalogue of the Family Cossidae of the Old World. Neue Entomologische Nachrichten, 66: 1-129.

External links 
Cossidae at Australian Faunal Directory

Australia